Same-sex marriage in the Northern Mariana Islands was legalized by the U.S. Supreme Court's landmark ruling in Obergefell v. Hodges on June 26, 2015, which struck down same-sex marriage bans nationwide. On June 29, Governor Eloy Inos issued a statement hailing the decision as "historic", and said he would work with the Attorney General and local officials in the Northern Mariana Islands to bring the U.S. territory into compliance. Attorney General Edward Manibusan issued a memorandum on June 30 confirming that the territory was bound by the court decision and said that marriage license forms would be changed to include same-sex couples.

The Northern Mariana Islands may be the jurisdiction with the highest share of same-sex marriages in the world. In FY2019, same-sex marriages accounted for 41% of all marriages performed in Saipan.

Background

There is no prohibition on same-sex marriage in the law of the territory, nor do the statutes specify the sex of the parties to a marriage between citizens of the Northern Mariana Islands. Other provisions assume the parties to a marriage are not of the same sex. With respect to a marriage involving one or more non-citizens, the statutes say: "The male at the time of contracting the marriage be at least 18 years of age and the female at least 16 years of age..." Statutes concerning divorce assume that the partners to a marriage are man and wife.

In December 2004, the Northern Mariana Islands House of Representatives voted 15–0 with 1 abstention in favor of a constitutional amendment banning same-sex marriage. The measure was introduced to the House by Speaker Benigno Fitial, who cited his Catholic faith as his reason for supporting the proposal. The amendment would have added the following section to the Northern Mariana Islands Commonwealth Constitution: "It is the public policy of the Commonwealth to protect the unique relationship of marriage and that only the union of one man and one woman shall be valid or recognized as a marriage in the CNMI and the legislature may enact no law inconsistent with the public policy on marriage." The amendment failed to pass the Senate.

The decisions of the Ninth Circuit Court of Appeals in Sevcik v. Sandoval and Latta v. Otter that found same-sex marriage bans in Nevada and Idaho unconstitutional were binding precedent on federal courts in the Northern Marianas before Obergefell v. Hodges. However, between October 2014 when the precedent came into effect and June 2015 when the Supreme Court struck down all bans, no same-sex couple had filed suit in the District Court for the Northern Mariana Islands to force the issue.

Obergefell v. Hodges
On June 26, 2015, the U.S. Supreme Court ruled in Obergefell v. Hodges that laws depriving same-sex couples of the rights of marriage violate the Due Process and Equal Protection clauses of the Fourteenth Amendment to the United States Constitution. The ruling legalized same-sex marriage nationwide in the United States, including in the Northern Mariana Islands. On June 29, Governor Eloy Inos hailed the decision as "historic" in a statement and said he would work with the Attorney General and local officials to bring the U.S. territory into compliance. Attorney General Edward Manibusan issued a memorandum on June 30 confirming that the territory is bound by the court decision and updating the marriage application forms to provide for same-sex couples.

Governor Inos issued the following statement: "The union between two individuals regardless of gender, race, ethnicity, etc. through the ceremony of marriage is a celebration of unconditional love and enduring commitment. While we acknowledge this historical ruling, we must remember that what is most important in our community is that we express love, compassion, and tolerance toward one another. [...] Same sex common law unions have been in existence in our culture even before this ruling. In our small community, we either have family, friends, or know of people who are gay or lesbian couples."

Marriage statistics
The Public Law 4-11 permits the Governor of the Northern Mariana Islands and local mayors to issue marriage licenses to "two noncitizens or between a noncitizen and a citizen". Since the legalization of same-sex marriage in June 2015, the Northern Mariana Islands has become a popular marriage destination for foreign same-sex couples, especially among Chinese tourists. 2019 estimates showed that tourists made up 99% of same-sex marriages in Saipan. The Public Law 20-53, enacted in April 2018, introduced higher marriage license fees for non-residents.

Saipan Mayor David M. Apatang conducted the first same-sex marriage in the territory on July 22, 2015, saying it was his "legal obligation" to perform the union. He said he was following the June 30 memorandum issued by Attorney General Manibusan. An updated version of the Northern Mariana Islands' marriage form provided by the Attorney General's office was used for the couple. By late August 2015, Apatang had performed three same-sex marriages. The first same-sex marriage in Tinian was performed on June 24, 2017.

According to the Saipan Mayor's Office, there were 12 same-sex marriages performed in 2015, 30 in 2016, and 88 in 2017 (63 between lesbian couples and 25 between male couples). The mayor's office conducted 96 same-sex marriages from January to September 2018. Of note, same-sex marriages accounted for the majority of marriages conducted by the office in the first few months of 2018. 256 same-sex marriages were performed in FY2019 (1 October 2018 to 30 September 2019). This accounted for 41% of all marriages. Far less marriages were performed in FY2020 and FY2021 due to COVID-19 pandemic guidelines.

See also
LGBT rights in the Northern Mariana Islands
Same-sex marriage in Guam
Same-sex marriage in the United States
Recognition of same-sex unions in Oceania

References

Northern Mariana Islands law
Northern Mariana Islands
2015 in LGBT history
Northern Mariana Islands